WayForward Technologies, Inc. is an American independent video game developer and publisher based in Valencia, California. Founded in March 1990 by technology entrepreneur Voldi Way, WayForward started by developing games for consoles such as the Super NES and Sega Genesis, as well as TV games and PC educational software. In 1997, they relaunched their video games arm, placing the company as a contractor for publishers and working on a variety of licensed assets.

The company has created a variety of original game properties such as their flagship Shantae series, including the first title in the series which appeared on the Game Boy Color and was published by Capcom. WayForward Technologies has worked on games for the Game Boy Advance, Nintendo DS, Nintendo 3DS and PlayStation Vita handheld consoles, WiiWare games for Nintendo's Wii and Wii U, Nintendo Switch consoles and games for personal computer and mobile phones.

History
WayForward Technologies was founded in 1990 by Voldi Way as an independent video game design company, following on from a previous company he started that specialized in software for sheet metal fabrication.  Early on, the company focused on producing software for the Super NES, Genesis, Game Gear and Game Boy Color. They branched out into educational games for the personal computer and Leapster. During this time, many of the staff were doing other jobs in order to support their ambition to become game developers.

In 1994, WayForward Technologies entered into a partnership with American Education Publishing in order to focus on developing further educational video games. The partnership was successful, with the company winning awards for innovation at the 1995 Consumer Electronics Show. During this time, WayForward focused on licensed assets such as the Muppets for their educational games.

WayForward restarted their video game development business in April 1997, working as a "developer for hire" by providing services to software publishers. John Beck, CEO, stated that by providing services on small projects the company has managed to remain a stable level of work. In mid-2002, WayForward released their first internally developed game based on their own intellectual property Shantae. While it achieved critical acclaim, it was one of the last games to be released for the Game Boy Color and as a result only enjoyed limited success.

When Nintendo announced the dual-screen handheld console that became the Nintendo DS in early 2004, WayForward began examining the various options the new console offered. Work started on a sequel to Shantae using the two screens. Despite presenting the concepts to a number of publishers, they were ultimately unsuccessful at securing a deal. Because of the large number of Shantae related assets that were produced, including 3D models, WayForward frequently uses them when trying out new technology or development platforms. In 2004, the company was contracted by THQ to produce a chat game called Ping Pals for the Nintendo DS. Despite the tight timescales involved in developing the game, WayForward used the opportunity to obtain development kits for the platform. The game was received unfavourably by the majority of critics and gained only a single positive review. In 2006, the company produced and released Justice League Heroes: The Flash just as the Game Boy Advance was reaching the end of its commercial life cycle, which met with largely positive reviews. WayForward has gone on to develop further titles for the Nintendo DS. Looney Tunes: Duck Amuck, based on the 1951 Warner Bros. cartoon Duck Amuck received mixed reviews upon release.

On February 19, 2008, John Beck and Matt Bozon were speakers at the Independent Games Summit, part of the 2008 Game Developers Conference, discussing a range of issues facing independent games companies. Lit was announced on March 5, 2008, and was released on February 9, 2009, for the WiiWare online shop platform. A new game in the Shantae series was considered for the platform.

WayForward introduced a new character named Alta, who is a pink-haired girl that wields a scepter. She represented a new intellectual property. This was revealed on March 9, 2009, to be a DSiWare game called Mighty Flip Champs!. WayForward created Mighty Milky Way, another puzzle platformer with a new character named Luna. Its sequel, Mighty Switch Force!, was released on the 3DS eShop on December 22, 2011, with a sequel two years later called Mighty Switch Force! 2 on the Nintendo 3DS' eShop.

Adventure Time: Hey Ice King! Why'd You Steal Our Garbage?! was released on November 20, 2012. A sequel, Adventure Time: Explore the Dungeon Because I Don't Know!, as well as Regular Show: Mordecai and Rigby in 8-Bit Land, were released in 2013. A sequel to Mighty Switch Force! was released on June 13, 2013. A new Shantae game was revealed via Nintendo Power, Shantae and the Pirate's Curse, which was released on October 23, 2014, on the Nintendo 3DS and Wii U eShop. Another game in the series, Shantae: Half-Genie Hero, was crowdfunded via Kickstarter and released in December 2016. On April Fool's Day 2013, Wayforward made a fake announcement for a game called Cat Girl Without Salad! Fans responded positively to the game's concept, leading WayForward to later develop it into a full title, which was released via a Humble Bundle in June 2016.

Games

References

External links
Official website

American companies established in 1990
Companies based in Los Angeles County, California
Video game companies established in 1990
1990 establishments in California
Privately held companies based in California
Video game companies of the United States
Video game development companies
Video game publishers
Santa Clarita, California